Bow Down is the debut studio album by American West Coast hip hop supergroup Westside Connection. It was released on October 22, 1996, through Priority Records. Recording sessions took place at Ice Cube's house studio, Westsiiiiide Studios, in California, except for the song "Gangstas Make the World Go Round", which was recorded at Treehouse Studios in South Africa. Production was handled by Bud'da, Quincy Jones III, Binky Mack, and Ice Cube, who also served as executive producer. It features guest appearances from Allfrumtha I and The Comrads.

The album peaked at number two on the Billboard 200 and topped the Top R&B/Hip-Hop Albums, shipping 145,000 units. It went on to sell 1.7 million copies in the United States receiving Platinum certification status by the Recording Industry Association of America on January 10, 1997. It was also certified Gold by Canadian Recording Industry Association for selling 50,000 units in Canada.

Its singles, a title track and "Gangstas Make the World Go Round", made it to the Billboard Hot 100, landing at number 21 and 40, respectively. The songs "King of the Hill", "Cross 'Em out and Put a 'K" and "Hoo Bangin' (WSCG Style)" are diss tracks towards hip hop group Cypress Hill, Q-Tip and rapper Common. "Bow Down" was used in 2002 film The Hot Chick, in 2015 film Get Hard, and in 2013 video game Grand Theft Auto V.

Track listing

Sample credits
Track 3 contains an interpolation of "People Make the World Go Round" written by Thom Bell and Linda Creed
Track 7 contains a sample from "Hurt" written by Trent Reznor as recorded by Nine Inch Nails

Personnel
O'Shea "Ice Cube" Jackson – main performer, producer (tracks: 3, 13), co-producer (track 4), engineering, mixing, executive producer
Dedrick "Mack 10" Rolison – main performer
William "WC" Calhoun Jr. – main performer
Kelly "K-Mac" Garmon – featured artist (tracks: 5, 13)
Terrell "Gangsta" Anderson – featured artist (track 13)
Ryan "Binky Mack" Garner – featured artist (track 13), producer (track 4)
Marcus "Squeak Ru" Moore – featured artist (track 13)
Jonathan Hyde – vocals (track 1)
Stephen "Bud'da" Anderson – producer (tracks: 2, 5, 7, 8, 10)
Quincy Delight Jones III – producer (tracks: 9, 11)
Cedric Samson – co-producer (track 3)
Keston Wright – engineering
Art Shoji – art direction, design
Manuel J. Donayre – art direction, design
Michael Miller – photography
Steven Wills – logo artwork
Marvin Watkins – A&R

Charts

Weekly charts

Year-end charts

Certifications

See also 
 List of Billboard number-one R&B albums of 1996

References

External links

G-funk albums
1996 debut albums
Priority Records albums
Albums produced by Bud'da
Westside Connection albums
Albums produced by Quincy Jones III